The term kestrel (from , derivative from , i.e. ratchet) is the common name given to several species of predatory birds from the falcon genus Falco. Kestrels are notable for usually having mostly brown in their plumage.

Description

Most species termed kestrels appear to form a distinct clade among the falcons, as suggested by comparison of mtDNA cytochrome b sequence data  and morphology. This seems to have diverged from other Falco around the Miocene–Pliocene boundary (Messinian to Zanclean, or about 7–3.5 mya). The most basal "true" kestrels are three species from Africa and its surroundings which lack a malar stripe, and in one case have—like other falcons but unlike other true kestrels—large areas of grey in their wings.

Approximately during the Gelasian age (Late Pliocene or Early Pleistocene, around 2.5–2 mya), the main lineage of true kestrels emerged; this contains the species characterized by a malar stripe. This too seems to have evolved in Africa and subsequently spread across the Old World until they reached Australia some time during the Middle Pleistocene, less than one million years ago. This group contains several taxa found on Indian Ocean islands. A group of three predominantly grey species from Africa and Madagascar are usually considered kestrels due to their general shape and habits, but are probably distinct from the true kestrels as outlined above.

The American kestrel is the only New World species termed "kestrel". The molecular data of Groombridge as well as morphological peculiarities (like grey wings in males and a black ear-spot) and biogeography, strongly support the view that this species, among the Falco falcons, is not a kestrel at all in the phylogenetic sense but perhaps closer to the hobbies. Other recent DNA analysis takes a similar view that the American kestrel is not a true kestrel, but rather than being linked to the hobbies is more likely genetically more closely related to the larger American falcons such as the aplomado falcon, the peregrine falcon, and prairie falcon. Though the species has not been renamed as a result of these genetic analyses, it is thus likely a descendant of archaic larger falcon ancestors evolved through a process of convergent evolution to fit a similar small prey niche in the ecosystem as the true kestrels.

Groups

Malar-striped clade or common kestrel group
 Malagasy kestrel, Falco newtoni
 Seychelles kestrel, Falco araea
 Mauritius kestrel, Falco punctatus
 Réunion kestrel, Falco duboisi – extinct (c.1700)
 Spotted kestrel, Falco moluccensis, found in Indonesia
 Nankeen kestrel or Australian kestrel, Falco cenchroides, found in Australia and New Guinea
 Common kestrel or Eurasian kestrel, Falco tinnunculus, found in Europe, Asia, and Africa
 Rock kestrel, Falco rupicolus, found in South Africa
Basal lineage(s) of true kestrels
 Greater kestrel, Falco rupicoloides, found in Eastern to South Africa
 Fox kestrel, Falco alopex, found in Equatorial Africa
 Lesser kestrel, Falco naumanni, found in southern Europe, India, and most of Africa except for the Sahara and equatorial forest areas
African grey kestrels (a more distant group)
 Grey kestrel, Falco ardosiaceus, found in Central to Southern Africa
 Dickinson's kestrel, Falco dickinsoni, found in Eastern to Southern Africa
 Banded kestrel, Falco zoniventris, found on Madagascar
American kestrel
 American kestrel, Falco sparverius, found in North America and South America

References

External links

Falcons
Bird common names
Messinian first appearances
Extant Miocene first appearances